Hornstedtia scottiana, common known as Scott's ginger, jiddo, or native cardamom, is a very large ginger (member of the family Zingiberaceae) native to Queensland, New Guinea and the Maluku Islands. Its fruits are eaten by the cassowary. It is also a food plant for the larval stages of the Banded Demon Butterfly.

Taxonomy
It was first described in 1874  by Ferdinand von Mueller as Elettaria scottiana from a specimen found in the rainforest in Rockingham's Bay by John Dallachy. In 1904, it was redescribed as belonging to the genus, Hornstedtia, by Karl Moritz Schumann.

See also
Domesticated plants and animals of Austronesia

References

scottiana
Taxa named by Ferdinand von Mueller
Plants described in 1904
Flora of Queensland
Flora of Papuasia
Flora of the Maluku Islands